Roșietici is a commune in Florești District, Moldova. It is composed of three villages: Cenușa, Roșietici and Roșieticii Vechi.

Notable people
 Svetlana Rusu

References

Communes of Florești District